Randy Halasan is a  Flilipino teacher who received the Ramon Magsaysay Award in 2014.

According to the citation, Halasan received the award for nurturing his Matigsalug students and their community, respecting their uniqueness, and preserving their integrity as indigenous peoples in a modernizing Philippines.

References

1982 births
Living people
Ramon Magsaysay Award winners
People from Davao City
Filipino educators